Terrence Alonzo Baker (November 15, 1960 – August 9, 2010) was an American actor.

Biography 
Baker was born on November 15, 1960, in Chicago, Illinois. He was a graduate of Marquette University in Milwaukee. Baker had an acting career that spanned 30 years. He was a successful actor on stage, TV and in film. Some of Baker's credits include Prison Break, Cupid, ER, and Early Edition. He also acted in films such as Gladiator and The Ice Harvest. Baker also taught acting at Columbia College and at the Act One Studios.

Baker died in his home at the age of 49 on August 9, 2010, after suffering from a heart attack. He is survived by his daughter, five brothers and four sisters.

Filmography
Death of a President (2006) as Hat Man
Stranger Than Fiction (2006) as Demolition Crew #2
Prison Break as Crab Simmons (2 episodes, 2005–2006)
The Ice Harvest (2005) as Dennis
ER as Vendor (1 episode, 2001)
Just Visiting (2001) as Cabbie
Save the Last Dance (2001) as Mr. Campbell
Cupid as Vaughn (1 episode)
Hoodlum (1997) as Willie Brunder
Due South as Lou Robbins (1 episode, 1996)
Gladiator (1992) as Storm Trooper

References

External links

1959 births
2010 deaths
Male actors from Chicago
American male stage actors
American male television actors
African-American male actors
Marquette University alumni
20th-century African-American people
21st-century African-American people